Shivaraj Virupanna Patil (born 12 January 1940) is a retired Indian judge who served as a Justice of the Supreme Court of India between 2000 and 2005.

Biography

Legal career
Mr. Patil joined the bar in 1962, practising in Hyderabad until the late 1970s.

In 1990 he became a judge of the Karnataka High Court, transferring to the Madras High Court in 1994. He served as Chief Justice of the Madras High Court from late 1998 until becoming Chief Justice of the Rajasthan High Court in early 1999.

Patil was appointed a Justice of the Supreme Court of India in March 2000, retiring in January 2005.

Post-judicial career
In July 2011, he was selected as Lokayukta of Karnataka State Government. 

He has authored a book, munjaavigondu nudikirana, which was released on his 72nd birthday, 12 January 2012.

He has two sons, Basava Prabhu Patil, Sr. Advocate practicing in Supreme court of India and   Sharan Patil who is a doctor, heading Sparsh Hospital in Bangalore.

References

1941 births
21st-century Indian judges
People from Raichur district
Living people
Justices of the Supreme Court of India
Chief Justices of the Madras High Court
20th-century Indian judges
Chief Justices of the Rajasthan High Court
Judges of the Karnataka High Court
Judges of the Madras High Court
Ombudsmen in India
Recipients of the Rajyotsava Award 2016